The Cap Roig Festival is an annual music festival held in the town of Calella de Palafrugell, Spain. Beginning in 2001, the event is held between July and August at the Castell de Cap Roig. Both national and international artists performed at the festival, such as Sting, Damien Rice and Andrea Bocelli. The area of the garden is 17 hectares, and holds a capacity of 2,118 people. The festival generates more than 15 million euros and 220 full-time jobs during the summer months.

History 
The construction of the castle and the gardens began in 1931.   Built and designed by married couple Nicolai Woevodsky and Dorothy Woevodsky, the couple left their life in London to build their dreams in this unique place by the sea.

The Cap Roig Festival is held in summer, being the most important event on the Costa Brava. The direction and artistic production of Cap Roig takes great names every year of music and dance in the castle and the botanical garden. In 2007, the British newspaper The Independent ranked him 2nd out of the 10 best summer festivals. The 17th edition, held in 2017, broke the attendance record with 46,316 viewers, which sold out 20 of the 27 scheduled concerts.

Editions

References

External links 
 Official Site

Music festivals in Spain
Music festivals established in 2001